Clueless ( or Poh Tak also spelt Phao Taek) is a 2010 Thai comedy film directed and written by Petchtai Wongkamlao (Mum Jokmok).

Plot 
The film stars Petchtai Wongkamlao, Suthep Po-ngam (Thep Po-ngam) and several superstar comedians, with everyone portraying as themselves. When famous director Wongkamlao wants to make a new film titled "Poh Tak...Yaek Tang Narok", these comedians were gathered to perform.

Clueless parodies behind the scenes of filmmaking and the Thai film industry including many Thai comedy films.

Cast 
Petchtai Wongkamlao (Mum Jokmok) as himself
Suthep Po-ngam (Thep Po-ngam) as himself
Anek Inthajun (Anna Chuanchuen) as himself
Musa Amidou Johnson (Joey Chernyim) as himself
Sornsutha Klunmalee (Tuarae Chernyim) as himself
Akom Preedakul (Kom Chuanchuen) as himself
Apaporn Nakornsawan as herself
Sudarat Butrprom (Tukky Chingroi) as herself
Chookiat Eamsuk (Nui Chernyim) as himself
Siriporn Yooyord as herself
Pongsak Pongsuwan (Theng Therdtherng) as himself
Choosak Eamsuk (Nong Cha-cha-cha) as himself
Chitisan Chaisena (Chusri Chernyim) as himself
Supaphorn Chaiyunboon (Cherry Samkhok) as herself
Pawita Preecha as Film premiere presenter
Thanya Phowichit (Ped Chernyim) as himself (guset)
Bamrue Phonginsee (Note Chernyim) as himself (guest)
Jumphot Srichamorn (Noi Chernyim) as himself (guest)
Endoo Wongkamlao as herself (cameo)
Leena Jungjunja as Journalist (cameo)
Phuping Pangsa-at (Ping Lumpraploeng) as himself (cameo)

Trivia 
Its title Poh Tak (actually means "broken pontoon") in fact, it is a kind of Thai soup similar to Tom Yum. Just Poh Tak is a seafood Tom Yum does not add nam phrik phao (chili paste), so the soup is clear. Sometimes it is called "Tom Yum Nam Sai" (ต้มยำน้ำใส, "clear soup Tom Yam"). In addition, the term Poh Tak is a Thai slang that means "caught lying".

References

External links 
 
 

Thai comedy films
Films set in Bangkok
Thai-language films
2010 comedy films
2010 films
Films about comedians
Films about actors
Films about filmmaking
Sahamongkol Film International films